Lee Atack is an American soccer defender who played four seasons in the North American Soccer League and one in the Major Indoor Soccer League.

Atack attended high school in Newark, CA at Newark High school, and played soccer for Coach Harold (Hal) Bodon. Following college at UCSF and San Jose State, Atack began his NASL career with the Los Angeles Aztecs in 1975. In 1978, he spent a season with the Oakland Stompers. Later in 1978, the Stompers were sold to a new ownership which moved the team to Edmonton, Alberta, Canada. Atack moved to Canada with the team, which soon became known as the Edmonton Drillers. In 1980, he moved to the Golden Gate Gales of the American Soccer League. He also played the 1980-1981 Major Indoor Soccer League season with the San Francisco Fog.
Atack has two sons and a daughter

External links
NASL/MISL Stats

American Soccer League (1933–1983) players
American expatriate sportspeople in Canada
American expatriate soccer players
American soccer players
Association football defenders
Edmonton Drillers (1979–1982) players
English expatriate footballers
English footballers
English emigrants to the United States
Expatriate soccer players in Canada
Footballers from Leeds
Golden Gate Gales players
Los Angeles Aztecs players
Major Indoor Soccer League (1978–1992) players
North American Soccer League (1968–1984) players
Oakland Stompers players
San Francisco Fog (MISL) players
Living people
1953 births
English expatriate sportspeople in the United States
Expatriate soccer players in the United States
English expatriate sportspeople in Canada